Tachoires is a commune in the Gers department in southwestern France.

Geography

Government and politics

Mayors

Population

See also
Communes of the Gers department

References

Communes of Gers